The Egbert Reasoner House (also known as Beth Salem) was an historic house located at 3004 53rd Avenue, East in Oneco, Florida. It was built in 1896 for Egbert Reasoner, a horticulturalist who was inducted into the initial 1980 class of "Florida Agricultural Hall of Fame" members. Reasoner and his brother founded Royal Palm Nurseries. He is credited with introducing the pink grapefruit to Florida. The house was added to the National Register of Historic Places in 1995. Despite this, it was demolished in 2015.

Efforts to conserve the house
In August 2013, the home was still in the Reasoner family, which hoped to have it relocated and saved when the underlying land was sold for commercial development. The home was scheduled to be demolished for construction of a RaceTrac gas station.

On June 30, 2015, the Reasoner house was demolished. After standing for 119 years, it was torn down in approximately one hour.

References

External links

 Manatee County listings at National Register of Historic Places
 Beth Salem at Florida's Office of Cultural and Historical Programs

Houses on the National Register of Historic Places in Florida
National Register of Historic Places in Manatee County, Florida
Houses in Manatee County, Florida
Shingle Style houses
Houses completed in 1896
Shingle Style architecture in Florida
1896 establishments in Florida
Buildings and structures demolished in 2015
2015 disestablishments in Florida
Agricultural buildings and structures on the National Register of Historic Places in Florida
Demolished buildings and structures in Florida